Ameriyeh may refer to:

 Ameriyeh, Kerman, Iran
 Ameriyeh-ye Bala, Iran
 Ameriyeh, Idlib, Syria
 Ameriyeh, al-Bab, Syria